Sean "Kirk" Thornton is an American voice actor, director and script writer working mainly with English-language versions of Japanese anime shows.

Career
His major roles include Brandon Heat in Gungrave, Hotohori in Fushigi Yūgi, Klein in Sword Art Online, Jin in Samurai Champloo, Hajime Saito in Rurouni Kenshin, Jet Link in Cyborg 009, Don Patch in Bobobo-bo Bo-bobo, Ensign Nogami in The Cockpit and numerous Digimon. Additionally, Thornton co-directed for the popular anime series Bleach alongside Wendee Lee and also serves as the narrator. In video games, he voices Number VII Organization XIII member Saïx in the Kingdom Hearts series and Shadow the Hedgehog (since 2010) and Orbot (since 2008) in the Sonic the Hedgehog series.

In early February 1989, he also appeared as a contestant on the game show Classic Concentration.

Personal life
Thornton is married to Julie Nesbitt. Together they have two children.

Filmography

Anime

Animation

Films

Live-action dubbing

Video games

Other voice work
 iLife 08 apps

References

External links
 
 
 
 

Living people
American male video game actors
American male voice actors
American male television actors
American casting directors
American voice directors
Year of birth missing (living people)